Itu is an historic municipality in the state of São Paulo in Brazil. It is part of the Metropolitan Region of Sorocaba. The population was 175,568 as of 2020, in an area of 640.72 km2. The elevation is 583 m. This place name comes from the Tupi language, meaning big waterfall. Two rivers flow through Itu: Tietê and Jundiaí. Itu has five hospitals, eleven bank agencies and one shopping center, the Plaza Shopping Itu.

Itu was founded in 1610 by bandeirante Domingos Fernandes. It became a parish in 1653. In 1657, it was elevated to a town and municipality. It became a part of Brazil in 1822. It became a city in 1843.

Geography

Its climate is subtropical, temperatures varies from 16° and 22°.  The summer is warm and dry, and the winters are moderately cold and dry.

It is located between the crystalline plateau and sedimentary areas.

Demographics

Population history

According to the 2000 IBGE Census, the population was 136,366, of which 123,942 are urban and 11,424 are rural. The average life expectancy was 71.53 years. The literacy rate was at 92.53%.

Transportation

The main roads passing through the municipality are:
SP-75
SP-79
SP-300
SP-308
SP-312

Tourism

Itu was the birthplace of nationally-known comedian Simplicio, whose catchphrase was "back home in Itu everything is bigger". This led to the city becoming known as the "capital of large things", with a number of oversized objects being constructed there. The town's "exaggerations" include a 4m tall yellow pay phone called "orelhão", an oversized street light, a giant car tire (which was set on fire) and a mast decorated with a star, claimed to be the world's tallest artificial Christmas tree.

With the increase in domestic tourism the infrastructure soon developed to attract foreign visitors as well as international meetings, seminars and congress events. In 1999 and 2003 the Seventh Day Adventist Reform Movement held their international delegation session in Itu bringing people from over 80 countries to the city at each event.

Notable people
 Ronaldo Mota Sardenberg (born 1940) is a Brazilian diplomat, at the United Nations (2003-2007), and politician

Sister cities - twin towns
Itu is twinned with:

 Salto, Brazil

Images

See also
Primo Schincariol

References

External links
 English translated Site
  Itu´s Portal
  Government Site
  Itu on citybrazil.com.br

 
Populated places established in 1610
1843 establishments in Brazil